Karahacı can refer to:

 Karahacı, Şabanözü
 Karahacı, Silvan